Neil Douglas Pinner (born 28 September 1990) is an English cricketer.  Pinner is a right-handed batsman who bowls right-arm off break.  He was born in Wordsley, Worcestershire and educated at the Royal Grammar School Worcester.

Having played for the Worcestershire Second XI since 2008, Pinner made his full debut for Worcestershire in a List A match against Middlesex in the 2011 Clydesdale Bank 40.  He made eight further appearances in that competition, scoring a total of 122 runs at an average of 13.55, with a high score of 37.  He also made a single first-class appearance in the 2011 County Championship against Nottinghamshire.  He batted once in the match and was dismissed for a duck by Charlie Shreck.

At the end of the 2015 season, Leicestershire announced that they would not be renewing Pinner's contract.

References

External links

1990 births
Living people
People from Wordsley
People educated at the Royal Grammar School Worcester
English cricketers
Worcestershire cricketers
Leicestershire cricketers